Conasauga is an CDP (Census-designated place) in southern Polk County, Tennessee, United States. It is located approximately 1.2 miles north of the Tennessee-Georgia state line and roughly 17 miles southeast of Cleveland. The Conasauga River Lumber Company is located at Conasauga.

History
Tornadoes struck the community during the 1932 Deep South tornado outbreak and again on March 21, 1974, damaging the local school, which then closed. Tragedy occurred in Conasauga on March 28, 2000, when a Murray County, Georgia school bus crossed a railroad track north of Tennga, Georgia and was struck by a train, causing fatalities.

Demographics

References

Unincorporated communities in Polk County, Tennessee
Unincorporated communities in Tennessee